Albert J. Pimblett (1919-2001) was an English professional rugby league footballer who played in the 1940s and 1950s.

Playing career

International honours
Albert Pimblett won caps for England while at Warrington in 1948 against Wales, in 1949 against France, and won caps for Great Britain while at Warrington in 1948 against Australia (3 matches).

Championship final appearances
Albert Pimblett played right-, i.e. number 3, in Warrington's 15-5 victory over Bradford Northern in the Championship Final during the 1947–48 season at Maine Road, Manchester on Saturday 8 May 1948.

County Cup Final appearances
Albert Pimblett played right-, i.e. number 3, in Warrington's 8-14 defeat by Wigan in the 1948–49 Lancashire County Cup Final during the 1948–49 season at Station Road, Swinton on Saturday 13 November 1948.

References

External links
History of Warrington Rugby League Club
Statistics at wolvesplayers.thisiswarrington.co.uk

1919 births
2001 deaths
England national rugby league team players
English rugby league players
Great Britain national rugby league team players
Halifax R.L.F.C. players
Lancashire rugby league team players
Rugby league centres
Rugby league players from St Helens, Merseyside
Salford Red Devils players
St Helens Recreation RLFC players
Warrington Wolves players